Edens Zero (stylized in all caps) is a Japanese science fantasy manga series written and illustrated by Hiro Mashima. It has been serialized in Kodansha's Weekly Shōnen Magazine since June 2018, with its chapters collected into twenty-five tankōbon volumes as of February 2023. The manga is published digitally in six other languages as they are released in Japan, with Kodansha USA licensing the series for English publication in North America on Crunchyroll, Comixology, and Amazon Kindle. An anime television series adaptation produced by J.C.Staff aired from April to October 2021. A second season is set to premiere in April 2023. A video game adaptation by Konami was also released.

Synopsis

Setting
Edens Zero takes place in the  a fictional space-faring universe inhabited by humans, aliens, and sentient robots. It is also home to various cosmic entities, such as cybernetic dragons that inhabit the cosmoses' border called  and monsters called  that devour planets and permanently rewind their time, creating alternate histories without causing time paradoxes.

All technology in the series runs on a magical power source called Ether, which forms the basis of the story's "space fantasy" aspect. One recurring device is the  a video recorder that allows content creators, called "", to access a same-named video sharing website based on YouTube. Several characters directly harness the Ether in their bodies with  a power from the universe's Dark Ages that grants its users superhuman abilities, which are further enhanced by a transformative  state achieved by pushing their Ether past its critical point.

Later in the story, the universe is established to be part of a larger multiverse with its own range of alternate histories and outcomes to certain events. All but a select few characters are oblivious to the multiverse's existence; those who gain awareness of it do so through exceptionally powerful gravity, which causes memories of their alternate lives to "fall" into their minds.

Plot
Shiki Granbell is a human and gravity Ether Gear user who lives among robots on the planet Granbell, a deserted theme park world in the Sakura Cosmos. The park is visited by two space traveling  – Rebecca Bluegarden and her robotic cat companion, Happy – whom Shiki befriends. After the park's robots force them off the planet to save Shiki from being stranded before their batteries die, the three set out to explore the universe by searching for Mother, the wish-granting goddess of the cosmos, whom Shiki recognizes.

Early in Shiki's journey, the space pirate Elsie Crimson gifts him with the Edens Zero, an interstellar warship left by his deceased grandfather figure, the mechanical Demon King Ziggy. Shiki prepares for his voyage by searching the Sakura Cosmos for Ziggy's android crewmates, the Four Shining Stars. He also recruits other friends he encounters in the process, including Weisz Steiner, a criminal from another reality created by a chronophage; E.M. Pino, an EMP android built by Ziggy who suffers from memory damage; and Homura Kôgetsu, a young swordswoman and successor to one of the Four Shining Stars. Meanwhile, Rebecca gradually discovers her own Ether Gear ability to reverse time and travel between parallel universes.

After assembling the Four Shining Stars, the crew return to Granbell and encounter a reactivated Ziggy, who has become malevolent and desires to eradicate all human life on behalf of machines. Avoiding destruction by Ziggy's enhanced Edens One warship, the Edens Zero crew travel to the Aoi Cosmos, where they become involved in an anti-robot war incited by the Nero Empire over Ziggy's genocidal actions. Shiki leads the crew to escape when Ziggy attempts to kill the crew with the empire's arsenal of 20,000 antimatter bombs. Realizing Ziggy's threat, the crew postpone their journey until they can defeat him.

The crew find Ziggy three years later on the Kaede Cosmos planet Lendard, where they rescue Rebecca's captive mother, Saintfire Nox. During their showdown, Ziggy reveals himself to be a mechanized version of Shiki from a parallel universe where he and Rebecca tried stopping the antimatter bombs, which caused a spacetime distortion that sent them 20,000 years into the future; tasked with preventing Mother's imminent death, which would result in humankind's extinction, Ziggy returned to the past by using the Edens Zero's time travel function, Etherion, made from Ether extracted from Rebecca's corpse. Pino also regains her memories and uses an enhanced EMP to restore Ziggy's original personality, revealing that the artificially intelligent Edens One has been controlling him to ensure Mother's death. At Ziggy's request, Shiki reluctantly destroys him to hinder the Edens One's plans.

Nox reveals that Mother can only be saved in Universe Zero, the convergence point of all parallel universes. The crew use Etherion to travel to Universe Zero's past, where they live altered lives with no memory of previous events until they encounter each other again, allowing them to prepare for their final battle against the Edens One.

Production
Following the conclusion of his series Fairy Tail on July 26, 2017, Hiro Mashima posted a Tweet on December 31, 2017, promising to start a new series sometime in 2018. After his visit to the Angoulême International Comics Festival in France, Mashima revealed that the new series would be "a new form of fantasy", and that the character Plue from his earlier series Rave Master would appear in the manga. On May 14, 2018, Mashima commented on Twitter that he was becoming "a little confused" due to working simultaneously on this series, a Fairy Tail continuation, and another "secret" project. He also stated that he was coming up with new ideas for the series "one after another". On May 30, 2018, Weekly Shōnen Magazine revealed that the series was tentatively titled Eden's Zero. Although the title is the name of the main characters' spaceship, Mashima revealed that he thought of a deeper meaning for it, but that its usage would depend on future developments of the story.

When developing the idea for his next series, Mashima originally anticipated using another sword and sorcery setting similar to the manga he had drawn for the last 20 years, but decided on creating a "space fantasy" adventure due to a lack of such contemporary shōnen manga; he coined the term "space fantasy" from his own misinterpretation of "SF", the abbreviation of science fiction in Japan, as a child. He also cited the genre's unpopularity in shōnen manga as an influence, viewing it as a challenge he wanted to overcome. Mashima has described his approach to writing Edens Zero as being in between those of Rave Master and Fairy Tail, combining predetermined story elements with ideas that he draws "just from momentum" while writing on a weekly basis to give the manga a "real time" feeling. He has also expressed an intention to end Edens Zero when its number of collected volumes is in between those of the two previous series. In 2021, Mashima stated that Edens Zero would continue the themes of friendship, family, and battles from Fairy Tail, but that it may change slightly by the end when the mystery of the character Mother is revealed.

Publication

Edens Zero is written and illustrated by Hiro Mashima. The series began in Kodansha's shōnen manga magazine Weekly Shōnen Magazine on June 27, 2018. Kodansha has collected its chapters into individual tankōbon volumes. The first volume was released on September 14, 2018. As of February 17, 2023, twenty-five volumes have been released.

The series is published simultaneously in seven languages: English, French, Chinese, Korean, Thai, German and Brazilian Portuguese. North American publisher Kodansha USA has released chapters of the series on digital platforms such as Crunchyroll Manga and Amazon Kindle.

Media

Anime

On June 12, 2020, Mashima announced on Twitter that the manga would be adapted into an anime television series. At the Tokyo Game Show livestream on September 26, 2020, it was revealed that the anime would be produced by J.C.Staff and directed by Yūji Suzuki, with Shinji Ishihira serving as chief director, Mitsutaka Hirota overseeing scripts, Yurika Sako designing the characters, and Yoshihisa Hirano composing the music. The series aired on Nippon TV and other channels from April 11 to October 3, 2021. Netflix acquired streaming rights to the series, which was released globally on August 26, 2021.

Director Yūji Suzuki died on September 9, 2021, before the series' broadcast was completed. Although he had worked in the industry as a key animator and episode director since the mid-2000s, Edens Zero was the first and only full series Suzuki directed.

On February 9, 2022, it was announced that the series would receive a second season. It is scheduled to premiere on April 2, 2023, with Toshinori Watanabe replacing Suzuki as the director.

Video games
On September 16, 2020, Konami announced that they are developing an Edens Zero video game. It was later revealed at the Tokyo Game Show 2020 livestream that two separate action role-playing games were being developed, one being a 3D game for consoles, and the other being a top-down game for mobile devices. In February 2022, the latter was revealed as Edens Zero Pocket Galaxy and was released on February 24 for iOS and Android.

On December 17, 2021, Mashima announced that he was developing an Edens Zero video game by himself using RPG Maker. Describing it as a "hobby project" that he worked on in his free time, he released the game, for free on PC on March 16, 2022.

Reception

Sales
In Japan, the first volume of Edens Zero reached 13th place on the weekly Oricon chart with 30,178 copies sold. The second volume ranked 16th with 41,506 copies sold, and the third volume at 18th place with 31,316 copies.

Critical response
The first volume received a mixed response from critics on Anime News Network, where it was rated on a 1 to 5 scale. Amy McNulty gave the volume a 3.5 rating, calling it a "solid start" and praising the story's pacing, characters, and art, while adding that it "may not blow anyone away". McNulty also commented on Mashima's similar visual and design choices to Fairy Tail – which she noted could be taken negatively – but opined that the manga could benefit from readers' familiarity with Fairy Tail, and found it accessible to new readers of Mashima's work. Rebecca Silverman, who also rated it 3.5, considered the manga to be Mashima's darkest work, and praised him for using themes that "helped make his previous series Fairy Tail work so well", citing Shiki and Rebecca's complementary backgrounds as orphans as an example. However, she expressed slight concerns over the story potentially becoming confusing for readers with the volume's implications of time travel and flash-forward cliffhanger. Faye Hopper, who gave the volume a 3 rating, found that the shift from "high fantasy pastiche to Star Wars reminiscent sci-fi" helped enrich the story, but criticized Mashima's humor and adherence to shōnen manga conventions. Teresa Navarro gave it a 2 rating, finding the characters and art style to be nearly identical to those in Fairy Tail, but considering its potential to gain a cult following from fans of the shōnen genre.

Notes
General

Translations

References

External links
 
 
  
  
 
 

2018 manga
Action role-playing video games
Adventure anime and manga
Anime and manga about parallel universes
Aniplex
Fiction about social media
Hiro Mashima
J.C.Staff
Kodansha manga
Konami games
Netflix original anime
Nippon TV original programming
Science fantasy anime and manga
Science fantasy video games
Science fantasy television series
Shōnen manga
Unreal Engine games
Upcoming anime television series